Alex Blofield (born 28 October 1991) is an English cricketer. He played three first-class matches for Cambridge University Cricket Club in 2015.

See also
 List of Cambridge University Cricket Club players

References

External links
 

1991 births
Living people
English cricketers
Cambridge University cricketers
Sportspeople from Shrewsbury
Shropshire cricketers
Cambridge MCCU cricketers
Alumni of Darwin College, Cambridge